Uwe Becker (born 10 December 1955 in Rosche) is a German former middle-distance runner who competed primarily in the 1500 metres. He won the silver medal at the 1981 European Indoor Championships. In addition, he represented West Germany at the 1984 Summer Olympics as well as two World Championships.

His brother Volker was also a middle distance runner.

International competitions

1Did not finish in the final

Personal bests
Outdoor
800 metres – 1:45.9 (Cologne 1979)
1000 metres – 2:18.80 (Cologne 1983)
1500 metres – 3:34.84 (Koblenz 1983)
One mile – 3:52.36 (Koblenz 1982)
3000 metres – 7:51.37 (Ingelheim 1983)
Indoor
1500 metres – 3:39.8 (Sindelfingen 1980)

References

All-Athletics profile

1955 births
Living people
West German male middle-distance runners
World Athletics Championships athletes for West Germany
Athletes (track and field) at the 1984 Summer Olympics
Olympic athletes of West Germany
People from Uelzen (district)
Sportspeople from Lower Saxony